Sherry Gong is an American mathematician specializing in low-dimensional topology and known as one of the most successful female competitors at the International Mathematical Olympiad. She is an assistant professor  at Texas A&M University.

Early life and education
Gong was born in New York City to two mathematicians, Guihua Gong and Liangqing Li, both later affiliated with the University of Puerto Rico. She grew up in Toronto, Puerto Rico, and New Hampshire.

She received an AB in mathematics from Harvard College, and a PhD in mathematics from MIT in 2018. Her dissertation, Results on Spectral Sequences for Monopole and Singular Instanton Floer Homologies, was supervised by Tomasz Mrowka.

Mathematics competitions
Gong is the second U.S. woman (after Alison Miller won in 2004) to win a gold medal in the International Mathematical Olympiad, which Gong won in 2007, earning a tie for seventh place out of 536 participants (she scored a 32).  She was the only woman on the U.S. team that year, and also one of only three women ever to make the U.S. team. She also tied for first place in the China Mathematical Olympiad for Girls in 2007.

Gong participated in IMO five times, winning HM in 2002, bronze in 2003, silver in 2004 and 2005 and gold in 2007. In 2005 she was named the 2005 Clay Olympiad Scholar. In 2006 she earned a silver medal at the 2006 International Physics Olympiad. She was a winner (top twelve) at the United States of America Mathematical Olympiad in 2005, 2006, and 2007, including placing 2nd in 2007.

In 2010 Gong helped coach the U.S. team that competed in the China Girls’ Mathematical Olympiad; five team members won gold medals. In 2011 she won the Alice T. Schafer Prize for Excellence in Mathematics by an Undergraduate Woman.

Career
After completing her doctorate, Gong did postdoctoral research as a Hedrick Assistant Adjunct Professor at the University of California, Los Angeles, and as a Maryam Mirzakhani Postdoctoral Fellow at Stanford University. She is currently an assistant professor of mathematics at Texas A&M University.

References 

Living people
Year of birth missing (living people)
21st-century American mathematicians
American women mathematicians
Harvard College alumni
Massachusetts Institute of Technology people
International Mathematical Olympiad participants
American people of Chinese descent
21st-century women mathematicians
21st-century American women